Gerasimos II Palladas served as Greek Orthodox Patriarch of Alexandria between 1688 and 1710. He is honoured as a saint of the Eastern Orthodox Church and is commemorated annually on 16 January.

References

Sources
 
 Great Synaxaristes:  Ὁ Ἅγιος Γεράσιμος ὁ Παλλαδὰς Πατριάρχης Ἀλεξανδρείας. 16 Ιανουαρίου. ΜΕΓΑΣ ΣΥΝΑΞΑΡΙΣΤΗΣ.

Gerasimus 02
17th-century Egyptian people
Eastern Orthodox saints
Gerasimus 02
Egyptian Christian saints
18th-century Christian saints